J Bole Toh Jadoo is an Indian animated action television series produced by Graphiti Multimedia. It was co-produced and aired on Nick. It is based on the movie Koi... Mil Gaya.

The show was the first locally produced live action-animation show in India.

Accolades
Tilak Shetty won the AnimationXpress.com Visual Effects Award for his VFX work on J Bole Toh Jadu.

References 

Krrish
2004 Indian television series debuts
2005 Indian television series endings
Indian children's animated action television series
Indian children's animated science fiction television series
Hindi-language Nickelodeon original programming
Nickelodeon (Indian TV channel) original programming
Indian television shows based on films
UFO-related television
Animated television series about extraterrestrial life
Indian television spin-offs